Hopong Township is a township of Taunggyi District in the Shan State of Myanmar. The principal town is Hopong, Pa'O Self-Administered Zone.

Hopong has many famous places, like Htam Sam Cave and Mway Taw Pagoda. Many visitors from different parts of the country enjoy going to Htam Sam Cave, which is not only a beauty spot for nature lovers, but also a place with numerous Buddha images which attract many Buddhist pilgrimages. Near the cave, moreover, free delicious vegetarian meal is served which is well worth enjoying. Mway Taw Pagoda is an impressive pagoda in the centre of the town which is the most significant religious site in Hopong.

Townships of Shan State